The 2014 Ludian earthquake struck Ludian County, Yunnan, China, with a moment magnitude of 6.1 on 3 August. The earthquake killed at least 617 people, injuring at least 2,400 others. , 112 people remain missing. Over 12,000 houses collapsed and 30,000 were damaged. According to the United States Geological Survey, the earthquake occurred  WSW of Zhaotong city at 16:30 local time (08:30 UTC).

Tectonic setting 
 The Ludian earthquake occurred at 16:03, Beijing time (08:03 UTC), on 3 August 2014. It was especially felt in the province of Yunnan, and less in the provinces of Guizhou and Sichuan.

The magnitude of the earthquake was 6.1 on the moment magnitude scale, with an intensity of up to VII (Very strong) on the Mercalli intensity scale. The quake was the result of a strike-slip fault, whose fault plane has a southwest-northeast strike.

Seismicity in this region of southeast Asia is the direct result of the orogenic activity of the Himalayan mountain belt. Due to the complex interaction between the Eurasian Plate and Indo-Australian Plate from Afghanistan in the west to Burma and China in the east, many shallow sub-surface faults are present in both southwest China and neighbouring Myanmar.

Recent earthquakes 
This particular part of Yunnan Province was struck by the Mw 6.3 Burma earthquake in 2003. Similar events have occurred in recent years due to strike-slip faulting in the nearby vicinity, such as the 7.7 1988 Lancang earthquake, the 2006 Yunnan earthquake of magnitude 5.0, which killed 19 people, the largest of recent times, the Mw 7.9 2008 Sichuan earthquake, which killed over 69,000 people, the Mw 6.9 2011 Shan earthquake, and more recently, the 2012 Yunnan earthquakes, which was the result of reverse faulting and not strike-slip faulting like the Ludian earthquake, killing 81 people and injuring 821 others.

Damage and casualties 

The earthquake caused significant damage in the immediate vicinity of the epicenter, principally in the city of Zhaotong, where power outages and significant structural damage were reported. Chinese authorities announced that the quake left at least 391 dead, and over 1,801 injured.

According to the South China Morning Post, the tremor was felt in nearby towns, including the capital of Yunnan, Kunming, also in Chongqing, Leshan and Chengdu in the neighboring province of Sichuan. Road access to Longquan Village (龙泉村) of Longtoushan Town (龙头山镇), Ludian County, was blocked, where buildings collapsed. In Ludian, it was reported that around 12,000 homes had collapsed, many of them being aged brick structures.

Aftershock 
Aftershock: 3 August 6:00 a.m. until 9 UTC in times or more (more than nine times more than M 3.0) up by China Seismic Bureau). The largest aftershock earthquake M 4.2.

Response and relief 

The Chinese government sent a 30-man team to the epicentre region immediately after the earthquake struck, as well as 2,000 tents, 3,000 folding beds, 3,000 quilts, and 3,000 coats to provide shelter for the displaced and homeless. The majority of the injured have been transported to safe areas.

Chinese Premier Li Keqiang, who flew to the epicenter on the morning of 4 August, sent a joint working group to investigate and assist the locals in the rescue.

Donation 
As of 17:00 (UTC+8) on 15 August 2014, Yunnan Province received 536 million Yuan in donated money and 50 million Yuan in donated goods.

Government and organizations

Company

Personal

See also

 List of earthquakes in Yunnan
 List of earthquakes in China
 List of earthquakes in 2014

References

External links 

Ludian
Ludian
Earthquakes in Yunnan
Geography of Zhaotong
Strike-slip earthquakes